Antoine Wehrer (born 2 February 1890; date of death unknown) was a Luxembourgian gymnast who competed in the 1912 Summer Olympics. In 1912 he was a member of the Luxembourgian team which finished fourth in the team, European system competition and fifth in the team, free system event.

References

1890 births
Year of death missing
Luxembourgian male artistic gymnasts
Olympic gymnasts of Luxembourg
Gymnasts at the 1912 Summer Olympics